The 2019 Judo Grand Slam Brasilia was held in Brasília, Brazil from 6 to 8 October 2019.

Medal summary

Men's events

Women's events

Source Results

Medal table

References

External links
 

2019 IJF World Tour
2019 Judo Grand Slam
Judo